Hua Mulan is a legendary Chinese heroine.

Hua Mulan may also refer to:
 Lady General Hua Mu-lan, a 1964 Hong Kong film
 Mulan, a 2009 Chinese film
 Hua Mulan (1996 TV series), a 1996–1997 Chinese TV series
 A Tough Side of a Lady, a 1998 Hong Kong TV series
 Hua Mulan (1999 TV series), a 1999 Taiwanese TV series
 Hua Mulan (2011 TV series), a 2011 Chinese TV series

See also
 Mulan Joins the Army (disambiguation)
 Mulan (disambiguation)